Marek Jóźwiak (born 21 August 1967) is a Polish former football player.

Club career
His first club was LZS Siemiątkowo, in the following years he was a player of the Błękitne Raciąż, Mławianka Mława and Śniardw Orzysz.

In 1988 he joined Legia Warsaw, where he played 348 matches in all competitions and scored six goals. He won the Polish Championship three times (1994, 1995, 2002), he won the Polish Cup four times (1989, 1990, 1994, 1995), the Polish SuperCup twice (1990, 1995) and the League Cup once (2002). In the 1995–96 season, he participated in the Champions League. He scored the last goal for Legia in spring 2005 at the age of 37 and 60 days, which gives him the second place in the club's classification of the oldest scorers, behind Lucjan Brychczy.

He also played for the French EA Guingamp, where he won the Intertoto Cup in 1996, and the Chinese Shenyang Jinde.

International career
Jóźwiak debuted for the Poland national team on 5 July 1992 in a friendly against Guatemala. He played for Poland on 14 occasions.

Managerial career
He was associated with Lechia Gdańsk, Wigry Suwałki and Wisła Płock.

References

External links
 

1967 births
Living people
Polish footballers
Poland international footballers
Legia Warsaw players
En Avant Guingamp players
Ligue 1 players
People from Płońsk County
Sportspeople from Masovian Voivodeship
Expatriate footballers in China
Association football defenders
Guangzhou City F.C. players